The men's 1500 metre freestyle competition of the 2018 FINA World Swimming Championships (25 m) was on 15 and 16 December 2018.

Records
Prior to the competition, the existing world and championship records were as follows.

The following records were established during the competition:

Results

Heats
The heats were started on 15 December at 12:11.

Final
The final was held on 16 December at 18:07.

References

Men's 1500 metre freestyle